Glycylglycine is the dipeptide of glycine, making it the simplest peptide.
The compound was first synthesized by Emil Fischer and Ernest Fourneau in 1901 by boiling 2,5-diketopiperazine (glycine anhydride) with hydrochloric acid.
Shaking with alkali and other synthesis methods have been reported.

Because of its low toxicity, it is useful as a buffer for biological systems with effective ranges between pH 2.5–3.8 and 7.5–8.9; however, it is only moderately stable for storage once dissolved. It is used in the synthesis of more complex peptides.

Glycylglycine has also been reported to be helpful in solubilizing recombinant proteins in E. coli. Using different concentrations of the glycylglycine improvement in protein solubility after cell lysis has been observed.

References

Dipeptides
Dimers (chemistry)